The Academia Nicaragüense de la Lengua  (Spanish for Nicaraguan Academy of Language) is an association of academics and experts on the use of the Spanish language in Nicaragua.
It was founded in Managua on May 31, 1928. It is a member of the Association of Spanish Language Academies. His banned by Ortega's government in May 2022.

Spanish language academies
Nicaraguan culture
Organizations established in 1928
1928 establishments in Nicaragua